The Plymouth Cabana was a 1958 concept car built by Plymouth. It was a station wagon that featured a unique glass roof for the rear portion of the car.

References

 https://web.archive.org/web/20040830230627/http://www.autoweteran.gower.pl/concept_timeline.html

Cabana
Rear-wheel-drive vehicles
Cars introduced in 1958
Station wagons